The Three Little Pigs is a well-known fairy tale. Three Little Pigs may also refer to:

Places
 Three Little Pigs (islands), three islands in the Wilhelm Archipelago

Art, entertainment, and media

Films
The Three Little Pigs (film), the 1933 Walt Disney animated short film
Three Little Pigs, a 1998 Disney animated short film
The 3 L'il Pigs (Les 3 p'tits cochons), a 2007 Quebec French-language comedy film
3 Pigs and a Baby, a 2008 American direct-to-DVD comedy film

Literature
The True Story of the 3 Little Pigs! (1989), a children's book that parodies "Three Little Pigs"

Music
Three Little Pigs – The Remixes, an EP of mixes of the 1992 song 
"Three Little Pigs" (song), a 1992 song by Green Jellÿ
 "Three Little Piggies", a 1969 song by Steve Peregrin Took and Twink, released on Twink's solo album Think Pink

Other uses
 Three Little Pigs (company), an American charcuterie company founded in 1975

See also
Pigs in a Polka,  a Merrie Melodies cartoon produced by Leon Schlesinger and directed by Friz Freleng
The Three Pigs, a book by David Wiesner